Chang Lo-pu (born 2 February 1929) is a Taiwanese boxer. He competed in the men's middleweight event at the 1960 Summer Olympics.

References

External links
 

1929 births
Possibly living people
Taiwanese male boxers
Olympic boxers of Taiwan
Boxers at the 1960 Summer Olympics
Sportspeople from Tianjin
Asian Games medalists in boxing
Boxers at the 1958 Asian Games
Asian Games gold medalists for Chinese Taipei
Medalists at the 1958 Asian Games
Middleweight boxers
20th-century Taiwanese people